"Welcome to the World" is a song by American recording artist Kevin Rudolf, released as the second single from his debut album In the City. The single version features vocals from American rapper Kid Cudi, whereas the album version features a verse from rapper Rick Ross. The chorus takes the melody from the 1994 Oasis single "Supersonic".

The song was featured in advertisements for WrestleMania XXVI.

Extended version
There is an extended version of the song that features verses from both Kid Cudi and Rick Ross.

Chart performance
"Welcome to the World" peaked at number 34 on the Billboard Pop 100 and number 58 on the Hot 100. In Canada, it reached number 56 on the Canadian Hot 100. It also debuted on Ryan Seacrest's Weekly Top 40 at number 40.

Music video
The music video was released to MTV on May 1, 2009. It uses the no rap edit version of the song. The video shows Rudolf singing in the streets with his band. Lil Wayne and Birdman make a brief appearance in the video.

Track listing

CD Single
 "Welcome to the World" (Clean) (featuring Kid Cudi) — 3:03
 "Welcome to the World" (Dirty) (featuring Kid Cudi) — 3:03
 "Welcome to the World" (Single Version) — 2:38
 "Welcome to the World" (featuring Rick Ross) — 3:03

Charts

Weekly charts

Release history

References

2009 singles
Cash Money Records singles
Kevin Rudolf songs
Kid Cudi songs
Rick Ross songs
Songs written by Jacob Kasher
Songs written by Kevin Rudolf
2008 songs
Universal Republic Records singles
Songs written by Rick Ross
Songs written by Kid Cudi